Marlyn Mason (born August 7, 1940) is an American actress, producer, and screenwriter.

Early years
Mason was born in San Fernando, California, and she was named after a friend of a friend of her mother. Mason moved to Hollywood after she finished high school.

Career
Mason played the role of Nikki Bell, a Braille teacher who became the title character's business partner, in the television series Longstreet (1971-1972), which starred James Franciscus.

Her other acting credits include roles in Hogan's Heroes, My Three Sons, Burke's Law, The New Phil Silvers Show, Kentucky Jones, Bonanza, The Big Valley, Ben Casey, Dr. Kildare (in a recurring role), Laredo, Occasional Wife, The Man from U.N.C.L.E., I Spy, Laredo, The F.B.I., Mission Impossible, The Fugitive, Mannix, Vega$,The Invaders, The Odd Couple, Love, American Style, Marcus Welby, M.D., Cannon, Barnaby Jones, Gomer Pyle, U.S.M.C., Wonder Woman, Boone, The Bronx Zoo, Charles in Charge, Ironside, Jake and the Fatman, and in the episode "The Mask of Adonis" from the 1977 series Quinn Martin's Tales of the Unexpected (known in the United Kingdom as Twist in the Tale).

She guest-starred on the final Perry Mason episode, "The Case of the Final Fadeout," portraying Erna Landry, a 'nice-girl' actress of a television show. She played Sgt. Margo Demarest in Twelve O'Clock High Season 3, Episode 9 "The Fighter Pilot"

Mason played a principal role in the original 1967-68 Broadway production of How Now, Dow Jones.

Mason also appeared in the films Because They're Young (her film debut, in an uncredited role), The Trouble with Girls, Making It, and Christina. She appeared in the television movies Brigadoon, Carousel, A Storm in Summer, Escape, That Certain Summer, Outrage, Attack on Terror: The FBI vs. the Ku Klux Klan, Last of the Good Guys, The New Adventures of Heidi, and My Wicked, Wicked Ways: The Legend of Errol Flynn.

Her most recent appearances have been in the television film Fifteen and Pregnant, the 2008 film Model Rules, directed by Ray Nomoto Robison.

In the 2019, she starred in the feature film Senior Love Triangle as the character Jeanie.

Personal life
She was married to musician J. Raymond Henderson from 1960 to 1962. She married Lee Harman in 1972.

References

External links

1940 births
American stage actresses
American television actresses
American film actresses
Actresses from Los Angeles
Living people
People from San Fernando, California
20th-century American actresses
21st-century American actresses